João Gabriel Schlittler (born 10 February 1985 in Rio de Janeiro) is a Brazilian judoka, who played for the heavyweight category. In 2007, he won a silver medal for his designated category at the Pan American Games, and bronze at the World Championships, coincidentally in his home city. Schlitter stands 1.97 metres (6 ft 5.5 in) tall and weighs 110 kilograms (243 lb). He is also currently a member of Clube de Regatas do Flamengo, a famous sport club in Rio de Janeiro.

Schlittler represented Brazil at the 2008 Summer Olympics in Beijing, where he competed for the men's heavyweight class (+100 kg). He reached only into the quarterfinal round, where he lost by an automatic ippon to Cuba's Óscar Brayson, who also defeated him in the gold medal match at the Pan American Games. Because his opponent advanced further into the final match, Schlittler offered another shot for the bronze medal by defeating Lebanon's Rudy Hachache, with a tate shiho gatame (seven mat holds) and an ippon, in the repechage bout. Unfortunately, he finished only in seventh place, after losing out the final repechage bout to six-foot and eight-inch tall French judoka Teddy Riner, who successfully scored an ippon in more than a minute.

References

External links
 
 

 Profile – UOL Esporte 
 Flamengo Profile 
 NBC Olympics Profile

Living people
Olympic judoka of Brazil
Judoka at the 2007 Pan American Games
Judoka at the 2008 Summer Olympics
Pan American Games silver medalists for Brazil
Sportspeople from Rio de Janeiro (city)
1985 births
Brazilian male judoka
Pan American Games medalists in judo
Medalists at the 2007 Pan American Games
20th-century Brazilian people
21st-century Brazilian people